The Slap is a 1974 French / Italian comedy film directed by Claude Pinoteau.

Cast 
 Lino Ventura - Jean Douléan
 Annie Girardot - Hélène Douléan
 Isabelle Adjani - Isabelle Douléan - la fille de Jean et d'Hélène
 Nicole Courcel - Madeleine
 Francis Perrin - Marc Morillon
 Jacques Spiesser - Remi
 Michel Aumont - Charvin
 Robert Hardy - Robert
 Nathalie Baye - Christine
 Xavier Gélin - Xavier
 Georges Wilson - Pierre
 Annick Alane - La femme de ménage de Jean
 Paul Bisciglia - Le serveur
 Robert Dalban - Le concierge du lycée

Reception 

On Rotten Tomatoes, the film has an aggregate score of 100% based on 5 positive reviews.

References

External links 

1974 comedy films
Italian comedy films
French comedy films
1974 films
1970s French-language films
Films directed by Claude Pinoteau
1970s Italian films
1970s French films